The 2022 Korean Series was the championship series of the 2022 KBO League season. It was a best-of-seven playoff and began on November 1. The SSG Landers clinched the best record of the 2022 season, and directly advanced to the Korean Series. They faced the Kiwoom Heroes, who defeated the LG Twins in the KBO League playoffs.

Summary

Matchups

Game 1

Game 2

Game 3

Game 4

Game 5

Game 6

See also

2022 Japan Series
2022 World Series

References

Korean Series
SSG Landers
Korean Series
Korean Series
Korean Series